Zagymnus clerinus is a species of longhorn beetle in the subfamily Cerambycinae. It was described by John Lawrence LeConte in 1873. It is known from the US states of Georgia and Florida and from Cuba.

References

Agallissini
Beetles described in 1873